Confidence Group of Companies Limited (also referred to as Confidence Group) is a Bangladeshi company, involved in manufacturing mid-tech manufacturing engineering products. The conglomerate commenced its operation in 1991 with cement manufacture, and is involved with power generation and the manufacture of Spun Pre-stressed Concrete (SPC) poles. As of 2017, the conglomerate claims to consist of 8 operational business entities.

Joint venture with Asian Paints

In 2002 Confidence Group established a partnership with mizanur Paints Ltd to form Asian Paints Bangladesh Limited (APBL).

References

External links
 

Manufacturing companies based in Dhaka
Conglomerate companies of Bangladesh
Manufacturing companies established in 1991